Cesinha may refer to:

 Césinha (Carlos César dos Santos, born 1980), Brazilian football left winger
 Cesinha (footballer, born 1981) (Luiz Cesar Barbieri), Brazilian football striker
 Cesinha (footballer, born 1986) (Cesar Augusto Pereira Marques), Brazilian football defender
 Cesinha (footballer, born 1989) (César Fernando Silva Melo), Brazilian football forward
 Cesinha (footballer, born 1992) (César Velez da Silva), Brazilian football forward